The Troy & Schenectady Railroad was incorporated May 21, 1836. The stock was divided into five hundred shares at one hundred dollars each. The building of the road began in 1841, and trains began running from Schenectady to Troy, New York in the fall of 1841 (21.0 miles). It was constructed by the city of Troy, the corporation issuing its bonds in the amount of $649,142. Consolidated into the New York Central Railroad under the act of 1853.

Parts of this railroad are, since service ended in 1965, now the Mohawk Hudson Bike/Hike Trail.

References

External links
Troy & Schenectady Railroad Website (KinglyHeirs.com)

Predecessors of the New York Central Railroad
Defunct New York (state) railroads
Schenectady, New York
Rensselaer County, New York
Railway companies established in 1836
Railway lines opened in 1841
Railway companies disestablished in 1853
Transportation in Rensselaer County, New York
1836 establishments in New York (state)
Albany County, New York